The Tower of London test is a test used in applied clinical neuropsychology for the assessment of executive functioning specifically to detect deficits in planning, which may occur due to a variety of medical and neuropsychiatric conditions.  It is related to the classic problem-solving puzzle known as the Tower of Hanoi.

The test was developed by the psychologist Tim Shallice and consists of two boards with pegs and several beads with different colors. The examiner (usually a clinical psychologist or a neuropsychologist) uses the beads and the boards to present the examinee with problem-solving tasks.
Several variants of the test exist.  Shallice's original test used three beads and pegs with different heights, although later researchers have generalized this to more beads without a peg height restriction.  Versions of the test are available from a number of sources, including a stand-alone test by William Culbertson and Eric Zillmer (published by Drexel University) and a child/adolescent version that is part of the original NEPSY neuropsychological battery of tests by Marit Korkman, Ursula Kirk, and Sally Kemp (although removed from the second edition). A computerised variant, known as the Stockings of Cambridge test, is available as part of the Cambridge Neuropsychological Test Automated Battery (CANTAB).

One common use is for diagnosis of executive impairment.  The performance of the examinee is compared to representative samples of individuals of the same age to derive hypotheses about the person's executive cognitive ability, especially as it may relate to brain damage. A certain degree of controversy surrounds the test's construct validity.

References

Further reading

External links
 Tower Of London Game
 PEBL Psychological Test Battery

Neuropsychological tests
Cognitive tests